Desmond Warman is a former football (soccer) player who represented New Zealand at international level.

Warman played two official A-international matches for the New Zealand national football team in 1948, both against visiting trans-Tasman neighbours Australia, the first a 0–4 loss on 4 September, followed by a 1–8 loss on 9 September.

References 

Year of birth missing (living people)
Living people
New Zealand association footballers
New Zealand international footballers
Association footballers not categorized by position